Maresaurus is an extinct genus of plesiosaur from the Middle Jurassic (Bajocian) Los Molles Formation of Argentina. The type species, Maresaurus coccai, was named by Gasparini in 1997. Recent phylogenetic analysis found Maresaurus to be a rhomaleosaurid.

See also 
 List of plesiosaur genera
 Timeline of plesiosaur research

References

External links 
 Smith, Adam S. and Dyke, Gareth J. (2008) "The skull of the giant predatory pliosaur Rhomaleosaurus cramptoni: implications for plesiosaur phylogenetics". Naturwissenschaften.
 Maresaurus from the Plesiosaur Directory

Rhomaleosaurids
Middle Jurassic plesiosaurs
Plesiosaurs of South America
Bajocian life
Jurassic Argentina
Fossils of Argentina
Neuquén Basin
Fossil taxa described in 1997
Sauropterygian genera